The 2022 Colonial Athletic Association football season was the 16th season of the Colonial Athletic Association football taking place during the 2022 NCAA Division I FCS football season. The season began on September 1 with non-conference play. Conference play began on September 24, 2022.

Background 
Monmouth and Hampton joined the CAA from the Big South Conference. James Madison left the CAA and transitioned to the FBS into the Sun Belt Conference.

Previous season 

The 2021 Colonial Athletic Association champion was No. 3 James Madison with a record of 12–2 overall, and 7–1 in conference play.

Preseason

Recruiting classes

CAA media day 
The 2022 CAA media day was held on July 28, 2022. The teams and representatives in respective order were as follows:

 CAA Commissioner – Joe D'Antonio
 Albany – Greg Gattuso (HC) / Jackson Ambush (LB) / Thomas Greaney (TE)
 Delaware – Ryan Carty (HC) / Nolan Henderson (QB) / Kedrick Whitehead (S)
 Elon – Tony Trisciani (HC) / Cole Coleman (S) / Jackson Parham (WR)
 Hampton – Robert Prunty (HC) / Jadakis Bonds (WR) / Axel Perez (K/P)
 Maine – Jordan Stevens (HC) / Joe Fagnano (QB) / Adrian Otero (LB)
 Monmouth – Kevin Callahan (HC) /  Eddie Morales III (DB/PR) / Tony Muskett (QB)
 New Hampshire – Rick Santos (HC) / Brian Espanet (WR) / Niko Kvietkus (DL)
 Rhode Island – Jim Fleming (HC) / Kasim Hill (QB) / Henry Yianakopolos (S)
 Richmond – Russ Huesman (HC) / Aaron Dykes (RB) / Tristan Wheeler (LB)
 Stony Brook – Chuck Priore (HC) / Reidgee Rimanche (LB) / Kyle Nunez (OL)
 Towson – Rob Ambrose (HC) / Cole Cheripko (OL) / Vinnie Shaffer (DL)
 Villanova – Mark Ferrante (HC) / Colin Gamroth (OL) / Jared Nelson (DL)
 William & Mary – Mike London (HC) / Carl Fowler (DL) / Colby Sorsdal (OL)

Preseason poll 
The preseason poll was released on July 28, 2022.

 First place votes in 

Preseason All-CAA teams  
2022 Preseason All-CAA

 Offensive Player of the Year: Ty Son Lawton, RB, Stony Brook, Sr.
 Defensive Player of the Year: Nate Lynn, DL, William & Mary, So.

Head coaches

Schedule 

All times EST time.

Regular season schedule

Week One

Week Two

Week Three

Week Four

Week Five

Week Six

Week Seven

Week Eight

Week Nine

Week Ten

Week Eleven

Week Twelve

Playoffs 
First round

Second round

Quarterfinals

Head to head matchups 

Updated with the results of all regular season conference games.

CAA vs FBS matchups 
The Football Bowl Subdivision comprises 11 conferences and four independent programs.

Rankings

Awards and honors

Player of the week honors

CAA Individual Awards 
The following individuals received postseason honors as voted by the Colonial Athletic Association football coaches at the end of the season.

All-conference teams
The following players earned CAA  honors.

First Team

Second Team

Third Team

Home game announced attendance

Bold – exceeded capacity
† Season high
‡ Record stadium Attendance

NFL Draft
The following list includes all CAA Players who were drafted in the 2023 NFL Draft

References